Tamagotchi Town (also TamaTown) was a Macromedia Flash-based website that interacted with versions 3, 4 (JinSei), 4.5 (JinSei Plus), 5 (Familitchi), 5.5 (Familitchi Celebrity), 6 (Music Star) and the new Tama-Go Tamagotchis. It allowed owners to obtain points and items online that could be used on the Tamagotchi. It transferred data between the website and machine using a 10-14 digit hexadecimal code typed when logging in and out (excluding Version 3).

V3 Tamagotchi Town

The original Tama Town was created for the Version 3 Tamagotchi. When you receive an item, a 10-digit password appears, and you enter it into the Tamagotchi. They have expanded the Tamagotchi online worlds to most all versions (except v1 and v2), the music star is the most popular virtual world called 'Music City', players were able to register their character from your 'Music Star Tamagotchi' and play games and talk. The ability to login as your 'Tama-Go' characters was also available.

The V3 Tamagotchi Town featured the Town Hall, Theatre, Mall, School, Grandparent's, and Parent's house, Arcade, Travel Agency, Food Court, and the King's palace.

On February 6, 2013, the servers for Tamagotchi Town shut down.

References

Further reading
 The Guardian – Santa claws is coming to town (October 12, 2006)
 Herald Sun – We're all bound for Tama Town (April 4, 2007)
 The Bakersfield Californian – '80s fashion, skulls to rule the schools
 St. Louis Post-Dispatch – Virtual pets to inhabit own community on 'net (September 17, 1997)
 New Straits Times – Entertainment for kids in digital era (February 9, 2004)

External links
 Tamagotchi Town

Browser-based game websites
Tamagotchi